Zone 1 of the Manchester Metrolink light rail network is the heart of the system where all of the other lines converge. Its boundaries are broadly equivalent to those of Manchester city centre, and approximately mirror the city's Inner Ring Road. Within Zone 1, first opened in 1992 as the City Zone, trams largely run along semi-pedestrianised streets rather than on their own separate alignment. The original route between the Altrincham and Bury lines ran to Victoria station via Market Street and High Street, and was soon joined by a branch to Piccadilly station by a three-way delta junction. A second route between the South-West and North-Eastern parts of the network was built to ease congestion on the original line. Opened in 2017, the Second City Crossing (2CC) added one additional stop to the network.

City-centre stops
Since 2019, there are ten Metrolink stops in Zone 1, these are:
 Cornbrook – a major interchange on the Metrolink system and is also in Zone 2
 Deansgate-Castlefield – interchanges with Deansgate railway station, and serves the Manchester Central Convention Complex.
 Exchange Square – located in Exchange Square close to the Arndale Centre and Corn Exchange. It is the only stop on the second city crossing between St Peter's Square and Victoria.
 Market Street – located in one of the main shopping streets and close to the Arndale Centre.
 New Islington – serving the New Islington area.
 Piccadilly – interchanges with the main railway station, located in the undercroft beneath the main railway concourse.
 Piccadilly Gardens – located in the busiest bus/tram interchange in the city centre.
 Shudehill – an interchange station similar to Piccadilly Gardens located near the Northern Quarter, The Printworks and Shudehill bus station.
 St Peter's Square – serves the Central Library and Town Hall. Is an interchange between the first and second city crossings.
 Victoria – interchanges with the main line station.

Two stations used to serve the city centre but have been closed:
 High Street – closed in 1998, unidirectional platform closed after extension of Market Street stop.
 Mosley Street – closed in 2013, unidirectional.

Use in ticketing
Metrolink tickets allowing travel to a Zone 1 stop also allow for travel within Zone 1.

Passengers who travel on rail services from the Greater Manchester area into one of the five railway stations of the Manchester station group (Manchester Piccadilly, Manchester Oxford Road, Manchester Victoria, Deansgate and Salford Central) will be issued with a ticket stating the destination as Manchester CTLZ as opposed to Manchester Stns. This allows visitors to use Metrolink trams between stops in Zone 1 for free on the presentation of a Manchester CTLZ rail ticket. The Freedom of the City scheme was introduced in 2005 by the Greater Manchester Passenger Transport Executive and retained as part of the new zonal ticketing system introduced in January 2019.

National visitors from outside Greater Manchester with Manchester Stns as the destination are not permitted free use of Metrolink, as it is a locally funded transport service by TfGM, and receives no national government subsidy.

History

Historically there were extensive tram lines in Manchester city centre as part of the first generation tram system; however, these were all abandoned by 1949.

The current Metrolink system started operation in 1992. The first Metrolink routes through the city-centre were designed to link Victoria and Piccadilly stations, as well as integrating the converted Bury Line (Bury-Victoria) and Altrincham Line (Altrincham-Piccadilly) into a single network. The first phase city-centre routes, consisted of a 1.9-mile (3.1 km) street-running route from Victoria, via Market Street to G-Mex (now known as ) where it joined the line to Altrincham Interchange: This is now known as the first cross city route (1CC). Also a 0.4-mile (0.7 km) branch to Piccadilly, which diverges at a three-way junction (known as a 'delta junction') at Piccadilly Gardens.

The first phase network was opened from Bury to Victoria on 6 April 1992; Victoria to Deansgate–Castlefield (then G-Mex) on 27 April; Deansgate–Castlefield to Altrincham on 15 June; and then the branch to Piccadilly station on 20 July 1992.

Since 1992, a number of alterations to the original routes have taken place:

Originally  stop had one platform for northbound trams, while High Street stop just around the corner handled southbound trams. In 1998, following the pedestrianisation of Market Street. High Street stop was closed, and Market Street was rebuilt as a two-way stop.
Cornbrook tram stop was opened in 1999, but was originally only for interchange and was not part of the "City Zone". A street-level entrance was opened in 2005, and it became part of a slightly expanded Zone 1 (as a fare boundary) when zonal fares were introduced in 2019.
Shudehill Interchange was opened in 2003, between Market Street and Victoria. A bus interchange opened alongside in 2006.
 In 2010, G-Mex stop was renamed , as the former G-Mex exhibition centre alongside which it was named after, had been renamed Manchester Central.
 stop was closed in 2013, to improve journey times and increase capacity.

In 2013, the Piccadilly branch was extended to Ashton-under-Lyne. The first stop on this new route, was not initially included in the "City Zone" but the zone boundary was changed in the first part of the following year to also include New Islington. When Metrolink fares changed from a point-to-point system to a zonal scheme, the "City Zone" was renamed as Zone 1.

Second City Crossing (2CC)

The Second City Crossing (also known as 2CC) is a second Metrolink route across Manchester city centre, first proposed in 2011 as a means to improve capacity, flexibility and reliability as the rest of the system expands due to phases 3a and 3b. Funded by the Greater Manchester Transport Fund, its  route begins at a rebuilt St Peter's Square tram stop, and runs along Princess Street, Cross Street and Corporation Street to rejoin the original Metrolink line by Victoria station. Following the submission of a planning document under the Transport and Works Act 1992, and a public inquiry held throughout 2013, the Second City Crossing was granted approval on 8 October 2013 by the Secretary of State for Transport, Patrick McLoughlin, and signed off on 28 October 2013 by the Greater Manchester Combined Authority.

Construction started in early 2014 on the new Exchange Square tram stop, which is the only stop on the new route, and the first tracks of the line were laid in late November 2014. Part of the new route became operational on 6 December 2015, when Exchange Square, along with a 500-metre stretch of track between the new stop and Victoria was opened, meaning a Shaw and Crompton-to-Exchange Square service could begin. The first test tram to run the entire route ran on 1 December 2016 and the whole line opened for public service on 26 February 2017.

Maps

References

External links

 Metrolink in the City Centre – from the Light Rail Transit Association.
 Metrolink : Routes : city centre routes – from TheTrams (outdated)

Zone 1
Transport in Manchester